The 2021 Missouri Valley Conference women's soccer tournament was the postseason women's soccer tournament for the Missouri Valley Conference held from October 31 through November 7, 2021. The First Round was held at campus sites. The semifinals and finals took place at Loyola Soccer Park in Chicago, Illinois. The six-team single-elimination tournament consisted of three rounds based on seeding from regular season conference play. The defending champions were the Loyola Ramblers, who successfully defended their title by defeating Evansville 4–0 in the final.  The conference tournament title was the fourth for the Loyloa women's soccer program, all of which have come under head coach Barry Bimbi.  The championship was also the fourth in a row for the Loyola program.  As tournament champions, Loyola earned the Missouri Valley's automatic berth into the 2021 NCAA Division I Women's Soccer Tournament.

Seeding 
Six of the nine Missouri Valley Conference women's soccer programs qualified for the 2021 Tournament.  Teams were seeded based on their regular season records.  A three-way tiebreaker was required to determine the fifth and sixth teams that qualified for the tournament, with the final team in the tiebreaker not qualifying for the tournament.  Drake, Evansville, and Illinois State all finished with identical 2–3–3 records in the regular season.  The final seedings and qualification were determined by points per match against the top four seeds during the regular season.  Drake earned the fifth seed with 1 point per match.  Evansville earned the sixth and final spot with .75 points per match.  Illinois State did not qualify for the tournament after earning .5 points per match against the top four seeds.

Bracket

Source:

Schedule

Opening Round

Semifinals

Final

Statistics

Goalscorers

All-Tournament team

Source:

MVP in bold

References 

Missouri Valley Conference Women's Soccer Tournament
2021 Missouri Valley Conference women's soccer season